Harderwijk railway station is located in Harderwijk, Netherlands. The station was opened on 20 August 1863 and is located on the Amersfoort–Zwolle section of the Utrecht–Kampen railway (Centraalspoorweg). The services are operated by Nederlandse Spoorwegen.

Train services
The following services currently call at Harderwijk:

Bus services

External links
NS website 
Dutch Public Transport journey planner 

Railway stations in Gelderland
Railway stations on the Centraalspoorweg
Railway stations opened in 1863
Harderwijk
1863 establishments in the Netherlands
Railway stations in the Netherlands opened in the 19th century